is a Japanese female idol group produced by Yasushi Akimoto, created as the  of the group AKB48. They are the first group from the Sakamichi Series, which also includes sister groups Sakurazaka46 (formerly Keyakizaka46), Yoshimotozaka46, and Hinatazaka46.

The group's musical catalogue includes twenty-eight singles and five compilation albums. Starting with their third single, each of Nogizaka46's single releases has reached the top position on the weekly Oricon chart. The group has also created radio shows, theater productions, television programs, and films, including NogiBingo!, Hatsumori Bemars, Nogizaka Under Construction, Asahinagu, and a series of documentary films about the group.

Nogizaka46 has twice won the Grand Prix at the annual Japan Record Awards, with consecutive wins for "Influencer" in 2017 and "Synchronicity" in 2018. The group has sold nearly 18 million CDs in Japan.

History

2011–2012: Formation and early chart success 
In 2011, Sony Music Entertainment Japan announced its plan to co-produce a new idol group with AKB48 producer Yasushi Akimoto after AKB48, which was signed to Sony's Defstar Records label from 2006 to 2008, became a hit and was considered a "missed opportunity" by Sony. The formation of Nogizaka46 was first announced on June 29, when it became the first group to be labelled as the "official rival" to the group AKB48, rather than a sister group like NMB48 or SKE48. The group was named after the location of the Sony Music Japan offices near Nogizaka Station. Producer Yasushi Akimoto said that the number "46" was chosen as a direct challenge to AKB48, implying that Nogizaka46 would succeed with fewer members. In contrast to AKB48 and its sister groups, the image of Nogizaka46 is based on the Japanese people's perception of conservatively-dressed private all-girls high school students in France, which carries the connotations of elegance and refinement.

Overall, 38,934 people applied to join Nogizaka46. Final auditions for the group were held from August 20–21, 2011, with 56 finalists competing for 36 available places, and 16 of them were selected as "senbatsu" ("selection") members for performances and media appearances. Many of the founding members have prior experience in the entertainment industry.

On October 2, 2011, the group launched its first television variety show, titled  and hosted by the comedy duo Bananaman.

On February 22, 2012, Nogizaka46 released their debut single "Guruguru Curtain". It ranked second on the Oricon chart and sold 136,309 copies in the first week. Their second single, "Oide Shampoo", was released on May 2 of the same year, and became their first number one song on the Oricon weekly chart, with sales of 156,000 copies. The choreography for "Oide Shampoo" caused a brief controversy, as critics disapproved of the members lifting their skirts over their faces during one part of the performance.

In June 2012, Nogizaka46 took part in Yubi Matsuri, an idol festival produced by Rino Sashihara, performing before 8,000 people at Nippon Budokan. They debuted their first musical theater production, titled 16 nin no Principal, at Shibuya Parco Theater in September 2012. By the end of 2012, Nogizaka46 reached number one on the Oricon yearly chart in the newcomers sales category, with annual sales of 870 million yen.

2013–2015: Second generation and national exposure 
Nogizaka46 held their first anniversary concert at Makuhari Messe in Chiba in February 2013, performing for 9,000 fans. From December 2012 to April 2013, an audition for the second generation of Nogizaka46 members was held, with 14 new members chosen out of 16,302 applicants. Thirteen of these new members were introduced at the musical theater performance of 16 nin no Principal deux, the sequel to the 2012 musical, in May 2013.  The group also launched their first radio program, titled , and released their first photobook, titled Nogizaka Ha. The photobook, released in October, ranked fourth on the Oricon weekly book ranking with 27,000 copies sold.

In February 2014, Nogizaka46 held their second birthday concert for 13,000 fans at Yokohama Arena. During the show, the group announced that their musical 16 nin no Principal trois would open at Akasaka ACT Theater on May 30 and run until June 15. The group also released the DVD and Blu-ray versions of their first birthday concert, which reached number one on the Oricon weekly DVD chart, selling 12,000 copies in the first week. On February 24, 2014, at an AKB48 group event, it was announced that Rina Ikoma would join AKB48's Team B, and that Rena Matsui from SKE48's Team E would hold a concurrent position with Nogizaka46. On July 5, 2014, the group performed overseas for the first time, as part of a slate of Japanese performers at the Japan Expo 2014 in Paris.

On January 7, 2015, Nogizaka46 released their first album Tōmei na Iro, selling over 220,000 copies in the first week. The album reached number one on the Oricon weekly albums chart. The following month, the group held their third birthday concert, this time  in front of 38,000 people at Seibu Dome in Saitama. Rina Ikoma returned to Nogizaka46, with Rena Matsui returning to SKE48. The group also launched a new television variety show, to replace Nogizakatte, Doko? Their first television drama, Hatsumori Bemars, premiered on the TX network in July. Nogizaka46 concluded the year by appearing for the first time on the NHK nationally broadcast New Year program Kōhaku Uta Gassen, where they performed their fifth single, titled "Kimi no Na wa Kibō".

2016–2017: Third generation and Japan Record Award 
From February 20 through February 22, 2016, Nogizaka46 broadcast an Internet TV program titled Nogizaka46 4th Anniversary Nogizaka 46 hours TV, in which the members produced and performed their own material for forty-six consecutive hours, on six websites simultaneously. In the week following the performance, the group's twelfth single "Taiyō Nokku" was selected for the 30th Japan Gold Disc Award. On May 25, 2016, they released their second album Sorezore no Isu, which reached number one on the Oricon weekly albums chart. The group promoted the second album with a second broadcast of Nogizaka 46 hours TV. On August 5, they released their second photobook, titled 1 Jikan Okure no I Love You, which sold 41,000 copies in the first week and ranked 1st on Oricon weekly book ranking.

From July 19 to September 4, 2016, the 3rd generation audition took place, with 13 finalists chosen out of 48,986 applicants. The final stage of the audition involved an appeal by 13 finalists to internet audiences using the SHOWROOM internet streaming service. Twelve candidates passed the final screening.

The group's fourth birthday concert was held during the last three days of their summer tour, instead of earlier in the year, due to booking issues caused by 2020 Summer Olympics construction. In November 2016, Nogizaka46 released the 16th single "Sayonara no Imi". It reached number one on the Oricon weekly single chart, selling 827,717 copies in the first week. "Sayonara no Imi" became the group's first Million single certified by RIAJ. Nogizaka46 ended the year with their second appearance on NHK Kōhaku Uta Gassen.

In February 2017, Nogizaka46 performed their fifth annual birthday concert over 3 days at Saitama Super Arena. The first day of the concert was the final performance of group member Nanami Hashimoto, who retired from the entertainment industry. In May 2017, the group debuted a new theater production based on the manga series Asahinagu, performing in Tokyo, Osaka and Aichi. That same month they released their third album, titled Umarete Kara Hajimete Mita Yume. Nogizaka46's first feature film, a live-action adaptation of the manga Asahinagu starring Nanase Nishino in the lead role, opened in cinemas across Japan in September 2017. The theme song for the movie, "Itsuka Dekiru kara Kyō Dekiru", was released as their 19th single.

The group's 2017 national tour held performances in Tokyo, Sendai, Osaka, Nagoya, and Niigata, and concluded on November 7 and 8 at Tokyo Dome, where they drew in over 55,000 fans each day. Three weeks later they performed overseas for the second time, with a selection of group members performing live at C3AFA Singapore. The group ended the year by winning the grand prize at the 59th Japan Record Awards for their seventeenth single, titled "Influencer", and by making their third consecutive appearance on NHK's Kōhaku Uta Gassen.

2018–2021: Departures, fourth generation, and overseas expansion 

From July 6 to September 2, 2018, the group held a national tour, starting with their birthday concert from July 6 to 8. On December 1, the group held their first standalone overseas concert at the Mercedes-Benz Arena in Shanghai. At the 60th Japan Record Awards, Nogizaka46 won the main Japan Record Award for their 20th single "Synchronicity", marking their second consecutive Japan Record Award win. In January 2019, Nogizaka46 visited Taiwan, where they performed at the KKBox Music Awards and held a concert at Taipei Arena. The group returned to Shanghai in October 2019, and returned to Taipei in January 2020.

A series of first generation member graduations started in 2018, when Rina Ikoma, who had centered six of the group's singles, graduated from the group in April. The final day of the 7th Birthday Live in February 2019 was a graduation concert for first generation member Nanase Nishino, who had centered or co-centered seven singles. In March 2019, Misa Etō held a solo concert as her final public appearance with the group. Nogizaka46's first captain, Reika Sakurai, graduated from the group on the final day of the 2019 national summer tour, and was succeeded as captain by Manatsu Akimoto.

On January 7, 2020, Mai Shiraishi announced her plans to leave the group after the release of its twenty-fifth single. On April 28, via her official blog, Mai Shiraishi announced that, due to the COVID-19 pandemic, her graduation would be delayed until it is safe to hold a graduation concert.

In the summer of 2018, a joint audition was held with Keyakizaka46 and Hinatazaka46. After the auditions, 39 members were accepted with 11 being assigned to Nogizaka46, forming the group's fourth generation. On February 16, 2020, five Sakamichi Series trainees were assigned to Nogizaka46 as fourth generation members.

On July 19, 2021, the group announced an audition for the group's fifth generation with applications starting that day and screening taking place on August 10. The new generation of members were planned to be unveiled in December 2021. To celebrate 10th anniversary of the group, Nogizaka46 released the greatest hits album on December 15, 2021, titled Time Flies,.

2022–present: Fifth generation and tenth anniversary
From February 2 to February 9, Nogizaka46 unveiled eight of the eleven new fifth generation members, with the remaining three to be unveiled in March due to academic reason. The group held their bi-annual 46-hour live on February 21-23 to commemorate their tenth anniversary. Their twenty-ninth single "Actually..." was released on March 23, with fifth generation member Aruno Nakanishi serving as the center (lead performer). However, due to having her past indiscretions exposed after the single's announcement, Nakanishi was put on hiatus as of March 3 and the center position was jointly taken over by Asuka Saitō and Mizuki Yamashita. Two of the three remaining fifth generation members were revealed on March 19 and April 1, while the last one, Hina Okamoto, was also put on hiatus for a contract breach. Both Nakanishi and Okamoto returned from their hiatus in mid-April.

The group held their 10th Year Birthday Live at Nissan Stadium on May 14–15, 2022. During the 11th Year Birthday Live held at Yokohama Arena on February 22, 2023, it was announced that vice-captain Minami Umezawa would succeed Manatsu Akimoto as captain of the group, as Akimoto would leave the group on February 26.

Members

Current members

Graduated members

Membership Timeline

Discography 

 Tōmei na Iro (2015)
 Sorezore no Isu (2016)
 Umarete kara Hajimete Mita Yume (2017)
 Ima ga Omoide ni Naru made (2019)

Tours and concerts 
Since their first "Birthday Live" concert in 2013, Nogizaka46 has held annual concerts during which the group performs all or most of the songs in their catalogue. At the first Birthday Live concert at Makuhari Messe, the group performed all of the songs from their first four singles to an audience of 9,000 people. In 2014 they performed for 13,000 fans at Yokohama Arena, and the following year they performed 69 songs in a seven-and-a-half hour birthday concert for 38,000 fans at Seibu Dome. The group's growing catalogue and fan base led to longer concerts at larger venues, including three-day concerts at Meiji Jingu Stadium in 2016 and  Saitama Super Arena in 2017, and a four-day Birthday Live concert in 2019 at Kyocera Dome, at which the group performed all 177 songs in their catalogue.

Nogizaka46 has also held a national summer concert tour each year at venues across Japan, concluding with a show in Tokyo. In 2013, the tour included ten performances in five cities, with a final three-hour concert at Yoyogi National Gymnasium. Four years later, the national tour concluded with a two-day performance for 100,000 fans at Tokyo Dome. In addition to the regular summer concert tour, the group has occasionally held concerts to commemorate holidays such as Christmas, or to highlight members of the group who have not been chosen to perform on the main singles.

Filmography

Documentary film 
 Kanashimi no Wasurekata : Documentary of Nogizaka46 (2015)
 Itsu no Ma ni ka, Koko ni Iru: Documentary of Nogizaka46 (2019)

Live-action films 
 Asahinagu (2017)
 Eizouken ni wa Te o Dasu na! (2020)

Television 
 NogiBingo! (NTV, 2013–2018)
 Saba Doru (TV Tokyo, 2012)
 Nogizaka Roman (TV Tokyo, 2012)
 Nogizaka Under Construction (TV Tokyo, 2015-)
 Nogizakatte, Doko? (TV Tokyo, 2011–2015)
 Hatsumori Bemars (TV Tokyo, 2015)
 Nogizaka46 Eigo (TBS, 2015-2021)
 Sagara to Kiyoto no Nogizaka Pupupu (TVS, 2015)
 Watashi no Hatarakikata 〜Nogizaka46 no Double Work Taiken!〜 (Fuji TV, 2018–2019)
 Zambi (2019)
 Nogizaka 46 no The Dream Baito! 〜Hatarakikata Kaikaku! Yume e no Chōsen!〜  (Fuji TV, 2019-)
 Nogizaka Doko e (NTV, 2019–2020)
 Samu no Koto (DTV, 2020)
 Saru ni au (DTV, 2020)
 Nogizaka Skits (NTV, 2020–2021)
 Nogizaka Star Tanjou (NTV, 2021–2022)
 Shin Nogizaka Star Tanjou (NTV, 2022–)
 Nogizaka46 Yamazaki Rena to Ohatsu-chan (dTV, 2020–2021)

Theater 
 16 nin no Principal (Shibuya Parco Theater, 2012)
 16 nin no Principal deux (Akasaka ACT Theater and Umeda Arts Theater, 2013)
 16 nin no Principal trois (Akasaka ACT Theater, 2014)
 Joshiraku (AiiA 2.5 Theater Tokyo, 2015)
 Subete no Inu wa Tengoku e Iku (AiiA 2.5 Theater Tokyo, 2015)
 Joshiraku 2: Toki Kakesoba (AiiA 2.5 Theater Tokyo, 2016)
 Hakaba Joshikōsei (Tokyo Dome City Theater G-Rosso, 2016)
 3 nin no Principal (3rd Generation members) (AiiA 2.5 Theater Tokyo, 2017)
 Asahinagu (Ex Theater Roppongi, 2017)
 3 nin no Principal (4th Generation members) (Sunshine Theater, 2019)

Awards 
The following table lists some of the major awards received by the group.

References

External links 

 

 
Japanese idol groups
Japanese girl groups
Japanese pop music groups
Musical groups established in 2011
Sony Music Entertainment Japan artists
2011 establishments in Japan
Musical groups from Tokyo
Sakamichi Series